The European Tour 2014/2015 – Event 4 (also known as the 2014 Kreativ Dental Ruhr Open) was a professional minor-ranking snooker tournament that took place between 19 and 23 November 2014 at the RWE-Sporthalle in Mülheim, Germany.

Mark Allen was the defending champion, but he lost 0–4 against Stuart Carrington in the last 32.

Shaun Murphy won his fourth professional title of the calendar year by defeating Robert Milkins 4–0 in the final. During the final Murphy made the 108th official maximum break, becoming the first player to make three maximums in a calendar year.

Prize fund 
The breakdown of prize money of the event is shown below:

Main draw

Preliminary rounds

Round 1 
Best of 7 frames

Round 2 
Best of 7 frames

Main rounds

Top half

Section 1

Section 2

Section 3

Section 4

Bottom half

Section 5

Section 6

Section 7

Section 8

Finals

Century breaks 

 147, 138, 129, 127, 122, 109, 105, 102  Shaun Murphy
 141, 109  Marco Fu
 140, 102, 102, 100  Neil Robertson
 137  Chris Melling
 136  John Higgins
 135  Joe Perry
 129  Lu Ning
 128  Craig Steadman
 125  Robbie Williams
 124  Matthew Stevens
 116  Sean O'Sullivan
 116  Thepchaiya Un-Nooh
 114  Liang Wenbo
 113  Andrew Higginson
 112  Mark Allen
 112  Fergal O'Brien

 112  Chris Wakelin
 111, 103  Judd Trump
 108  Robert Milkins
 108  Matthew Selt
 106  Marc Davis
 106  Zack Richardson
 106  Zhou Yuelong
 104  Mark Joyce
 104  David Grace
 103  Stuart Bingham
 102, 101  Stephen Maguire
 102  Jimmy Robertson
 102  Cao Yupeng
 102  Stuart Carrington
 101  Daniel Wells
 101  Luke Garland

References

External links
 2014 Kreativ Dental Ruhr Open – Pictures by Tai Chengzhe at Facebook

2014
ET4
2014 in German sport